Gaston Rivierre (3 June 1862 – 1 December 1942) was a French racing cyclist. He was born in Asnières-sur-Seine and died in Levallois-Perret. A member of the first generation of professional cyclists, he won the 1894 Paris–Lyon–Paris, the 1896 24-hour race of Bol d'Or, the 1896, 1897 and 1898 Bordeaux–Paris, and finished fourth in the 1897 Paris–Roubaix.

References

External links
 

1862 births
1942 deaths
French male cyclists
People from Asnières-sur-Seine
Sportspeople from Hauts-de-Seine
Cyclists from Île-de-France